"It's Four in the Morning" (also known as "Four in the Morning") is a song made famous by country music singer Faron Young. Released in 1971, the song was his first No. 1 hit single on the Billboard Hot Country Singles chart since 1961's "Hello Walls". The song was written by Jerry Chesnut.

The song was the title track to his 1971 album and became one of his best-known hits. It was also a major smash in the UK, somewhat rare for a country song, peaking at No. 3 in the UK Singles Chart in September 1972, as well as charting in the Top Ten (#9) in Australia, during late August 1972.

Its pop-crossover impact at home was far more minor, barely scraping the bottom of the Billboard Hot 100 at No. 92 (it was Young's last appearance on the Hot 100). It sold over 500,000 copies in the UK, and 750,000 in North America by early 1973, earning Young a gold disc awarded by the RIAA.

A live performance video clip of Young singing the song was the first music video to air on CMT when the cable television channel first launched on March 5, 1983, as CMTV.

Chart performance

Cover versions
The song was covered by Tom Jones on his 1985 album Tender Loving Care. His version peaked at number 36 on the Billboard Hot Country Singles chart in 1986.

Notes

References
 Roland, Tom, "The Billboard Book of Number One Country Hits" (Billboard Books, Watson-Guptill Publications, New York, 1991, p. 63f.
 Prefab Sprout,"Faron Young".

1972 singles
1985 singles
Faron Young songs
Tom Jones (singer) songs
Songs written by Jerry Chesnut
Song recordings produced by Jerry Kennedy
1971 songs
Mercury Records singles